11-Deoxycortisol, also known as cortodoxone (INN), cortexolone as well as 17α,21-dihydroxyprogesterone or 17α,21-dihydroxypregn-4-ene-3,20-dione, is an endogenous glucocorticoid steroid hormone, and a metabolic intermediate towards cortisol. It was first described by Tadeusz Reichstein in 1938 as Substance S, thus has also been referred to as Reichstein's Substance S or Compound S.

Function
11-Deoxycortisol acts as a glucocorticoid, though is less potent than cortisol.

11-Deoxycortisol is synthesized from 17α-hydroxyprogesterone by 21-hydroxylase and is converted to cortisol by 11β-hydroxylase.

11-Deoxycortisol in mammals has limited biological activity and mainly acts as metabolic intermediate within the glucocorticoid pathway, leading to cortisol. In sea lamprey, a member of the agnathans that evolved more than 500 million years ago, 11-deoxycortisol is the major and final glucocorticoid, with mineralocorticoid activity. 11-deoxycortisol also takes part, by binding to specific corticosteroid receptors, in intestinal osmoregulation in sea lamprey at metamorphosis, during which they develop seawater tolerance before downstream migration. Sea lamprey do not have 11β-hydroxylase enzyme (CYP11B1) that converts 11-deoxycortisol to cortisol and 11-deoxycorticosterone to corticosterone in mammals. This indicates that a complex and highly specific corticosteroid signaling pathway evolved at least 500 million years ago with the arrival of the earliest vertebrate. The absence of cortisol and corticosterone in sea lampreys suggests that the 11β-hydroxylase enzyme may not have been present early in vertebrate evolution.

Clinical significance
11-Deoxycortisol in mammals has limited glucocorticoid activity, but it is the direct precursor of the major mammalian glucocorticoid, cortisol. As a result, the level of 11-deoxycortisol is measured to diagnose impaired cortisol synthesis, to find out the enzyme deficiency that causes impairment along the pathway to cortisol, and to differentiate adrenal disorders.

In 11β-hydroxylase deficiency, 11-deoxycortisol and 11-deoxycorticosterone levels increase, and
excess of 11-deoxycorticosterone leads to mineralocorticoid-based hypertension (as opposed to 21-hydroxylase deficiency, in which patients have low blood pressure from a lack of mineralocorticoids). In 11β-hydroxylase deficiency, 11-deoxycortisol can also be converted to androstenedione in a pathway that could explain the increase in androstenedione levels this condition.

In 21-hydroxylase deficiency, 11-deoxycortisol levels are low.

History 
In 1934, biochemist Tadeus Reichstein, working in Switzerland, began research on extracts from animal adrenal glands in order to isolate physiologically active compounds. He was publishing results of his findings along the way. By 1944, he already isolated and elucidated the chemical structure of 29 pure substances. He was assigning names that consisted of the word "Substance" and a letter from the Latin alphabet to the newly found substances. In 1938, he has published an article about "Substance R" and "Substance S" describing their chemical structures and properties. The Substance S since about 1955 became known as 11-Deoxycortisol.

In the 1930s and 1940s clinicians were discovering many uses for the newly discovered hormones, however, only minute quantities could be extracted from animal organs. Chemists were looking for production of these hormones on a larger industrial scale.

In 1949, American research chemist Percy Lavon Julian, in looking for ways to produce cortisone, announced the synthesis of the Compound S, from the cheap and readily available pregnenolone (synthesized from the soybean oil sterol stigmasterol).

On April 5, 1952, biochemist Durey Peterson and microbiologist Herbert Murray at Upjohn, published the first report of a breakthrough fermentation process for the microbial 11α-oxygenation of steroids (e.g. progesterone) in a single step by common molds of the order Mucorales.
11α-oxygenation of Compound S produces 11α-hydrocortisone, which can be chemically oxidized to cortisone, or converted by further chemical steps to 11β-hydrocortisone (cortisol).

See also
 11-Deoxycorticosterone
 Cortexolone 17α-propionate

References

Glucocorticoids
Mineralocorticoids
Pregnanes